Leslie Wilkins (21 July 1907 – 1979) was a Welsh football inside forward and wing half who played in the Football League, most notably for Swindon Town and Brentford.

Career statistics

References

Footballers from Swansea
Welsh footballers
Association football inside forwards
Association football wing halves
Swansea City A.F.C. players
Brentford F.C. players
English Football League players
1907 births
Merthyr Town F.C. players
Sunderland A.F.C. players
West Ham United F.C. players
Swindon Town F.C. players
Stockport County F.C. players
Yeovil Town F.C. players
Southern Football League players
Western Football League players
1979 deaths